Zaur  Qubad oglu Tagizade (born 21 February 1979 in Baku, Soviet Union) is a retired Azerbaijani footballer. He has made 40 appearances for the Azerbaijan national football team.

Early life
Tagizade began playing football in 1990 at the age of 11. His first coach was Neftchi Baku former defender Vyacheslav Semiglazov. During 1995–98 years he played for the Kur Nur, Estonian Lelle SK and Icelandic IA Akranes.

Club career
He came back to Azerbaijan in 1998 and signed his first professional contract with Shafa Baku. At that time, he also played for Azerbaijan U17, Azerbaijan U19, Azerbaijan U21 and Azerbaijan national football team.
After the short Flora Tallinn career he played for MOIK Baku, Shafa Baku and Neftchi Baku, won two times Azerbaijan Cup and Azerbaijan Premier League. He retired football in 2010 because of numerous injuries.

International career
For Azerbaijan, Tagizade is capped 40 times, scoring 6 goal. He made his national team debut on 4 June 1997 against Estonia in friendly match. He scored his first goal on 5 June 1999 against Liechtenstein in a UEFA Euro 2000 qualifying.

International goals

Honors
Neftchi Baku
Azerbaijan Premier League: 2003–04, 2004–05 
Azerbaijan Cup: 2000–01, 2003–04
 CIS Cup
 Winners: 2006
 Runners-up: 2005

Individual
 Azerbaijan Player of the Year: 2001

References

External links
 

Living people
1979 births
Azerbaijani footballers
Azerbaijani expatriate footballers
Azerbaijan international footballers
FC Flora players
Expatriate footballers in Estonia
Expatriate footballers in Iceland
MOIK Baku players
Footballers from Baku
Association football wingers
Neftçi PFK players
Meistriliiga players
Esiliiga players
Azerbaijani expatriate sportspeople in Estonia
Azerbaijani expatriate sportspeople in Iceland